Freestyle skiing at the 2022 Winter Olympics were held at the Genting Snow Park in Zhangjiakou and Big Air Shougang in Beijing, China. The events were held between 3 and 19 February 2022. A total of 13 freestyle skiing events were held.

In July 2018, the International Olympic Committee (IOC) officially added three events to the Olympic program: big air for men and women, along with a mixed team aerials event. A total of 284 quota spots (142 per gender) were distributed to the sport, a decline of 4 from the 2018 Winter Olympics. A total of 13 events were contested, six for men, six for women and one mixed.

Qualification

A maximum of 284 quota spots are available to athletes at the games. A maximum of 30 athletes could be entered by a National Olympic Committee, with a maximum of 16 men or 16 women. If a NOC has qualified enough athletes to enter the mixed team event in aerials then they may extend their total to 32 athletes.  Each event has a specific quota amount allocated to it. The athlete quota per event is listed below.

Big air and slopestyle have a combined event quota.

Competition schedule
The following were the planned competition schedule for all thirteen events.

Sessions that include the event finals are shown in bold.

All times are (UTC+8).

Medal summary
China led all nations in the medal count with four gold medals, while the United States achieved the most medals overall, with eight.

Medal table

Men's events

Women's events

Mixed

Participating nations
26 nations sent freestyle skiiers to compete in the events, including the IOC's designation of Russian Olympic Committee, were scheduled to participate. The numbers of athletes are shown in parentheses.

References

External links
 Official Results Book – Freestyle Skiing

 
2022
2022 Winter Olympics events
Winter Olympics